Tsang Yam-pui  (born 11 September 1946) is the former Commissioner of Police of Hong Kong from January 2001 to December 2003. Also, he is the brother of the former Chief executive Donald Tsang. Their high positions in the government has referred both of them as the "Two high officials". His father was also a Hong Kong police officer.

Career

Police
Tsang joined the Hong Kong Police in January 1966 as a Probationary Inspector. From 1987 to 1989 he was in charge of the Narcotics bureau. From 1992 to 1994 he was headed the criminal law division, including the commander for Hong Kong island region. In 1995 he was director of crime and security department. From 1996 to 1999 he was deputy commissioner of police. In 2001, he became the HK Commissioner of Police and retired in 2003.

Property director
In May 2004, he joined property firm NWS Holdings, a subsidiary of New World Development, as an executive director. Prior to his brother becoming Chief executive of Hong Kong, there were criticism in 2005 that Tsang Yam-pui moved from a position of highest trust (police commissioner) to an executive of a real estate firm, where the company's profit depend on the government's regulation. Tsang Yam-pui was further appointed as chief executive officer of NWS Holdings between July 2015 to December 2018. From January 2019, he became a non-executive director of the company.

Honours
Tsang was awarded several honours in recognition of his services including the Queen's Police Medal, the Colonial Police Medal, the Order of the British Empire, and the Gold Bauhinia Star in 2003 upon his retirement as the Commissioner of the service.

Controversy

NWS deal issue
As early as June 2003, New World Development wanted to convert the Wan Chai Hong Kong Convention and Exhibition Centre car park into a used car venue. After Tsang Yam-pui became director, and Donald Tsang became chief executive, the demand by New World was approved. Both brothers denied any association to this deal. A NWS spokesman even had to come out to say they were not involved.

Hair dye court case
As a commissioner, he engaged in a public dispute with a female senior inspector, Sharon Lim, who refused to remove highlights from her hair, which she had dyed since 1987. Tsang's rule of not allowing dyed hair in his police department went into effect in 2001. Lim was one of four policewomen who kept their hair dyed, and the case had to be settled in court.

References

1946 births
Living people
Hong Kong businesspeople
Hong Kong Police commissioners
Officers of the Order of the British Empire
Recipients of the Gold Bauhinia Star
Hong Kong recipients of the Queen's Police Medal
Recipients of the Colonial Police Medal
New World Development people
Graduates of the Royal College of Defence Studies